Mount Elizabeth may refer to:
Mount Elizabeth (Antarctica)
Mount Elizabeth (Victoria)
Mount Elizabeth Archeological Site, an archaeological site in Florida
Mount Elizabeth Hospital, a private hospital in Singapore
Mount Elizabeth Secondary School, a public school in British Columbia, Canada.
Mount Elizabeth Station, a pastoral lease in Western Australia.